Rugby union at the 1920 Summer Olympics was played in Antwerp, Belgium. Two nations entered the rugby union event at the 1920 Summer Olympics — France and the United States. The French team were thought to be assured of the gold medal and came in as raging favourites in the event. However, the United States team surprised everyone when defeating France by eight points to nil.

Summary 
The rugby football Olympic tournament consisted of only one match. It was played between the United States and France. The US squad was made up of American football players from California universities, notably Stanford, California, and Santa Clara. Due to American football becoming an increasingly violent sport, these and other west coast universities chose to instead play rugby union from 1906-1914.

On the other side, the French team was composed of players from four clubs near Paris: Racing Club, Olympique, Club Athlétique des Sports Généraux, and Sporting Club Universitaire. 

United States player Rudy Scholz wrote about the match:

After the Olympic competition, the US team toured England and France in 1924, playing three games in England as preparation for the 1924 Olympic competition.

On 19 September, in Lyon, United States defeated a team representing the southeast of France 26–0. The American team also achieved victories against a southern French team (in Toulouse) and a southwest side at Bordeaux. United States was later defeated by France 14–5 in Paris.

Match details

Medal summary

Medal table

Medalists

Notes 
Rugby Commissioner and President of the California Rugby Union, Harry Maloney, was Coach and Trainer of the team.
 James Fitzpatrick is missing in the IOC medal database but he did compete in the match. 
 James Winston is listed in the IOC medal database but he did not participate. 
 Bill Muldoon was also a squad member of the American team but did not compete (and is not listed in the IOC medal database). 
 Raymond Berrurier is listed in the IOC medal database but he did not participate. 
 Constant Lamaignière, Eugène Soulié, and Robert Thierry were squad members for the French team but they did not play (and were not listed in the IOC medal database).
 Morris Kirksey also won gold for the United States in the 4x100 metre relay at these games.

References

External links

 

 
1920 Summer Olympics events
1920
Oly